27, Memory Lane is a British romantic drama film, written and directed by Luke Hupton and starring Jason Redshaw, Diona Doherty, Eileen Page, James Clay and Charles O`Neill.

Cast
 Eileen Page as Elise Babineau
 Samantha Mesagno as Keira Healy
 James Clay as August Pennyworth
 Mario Babic as Dr. Dijkstra 
 Diona Doherty as Niam Healy
 Mark Tristan Eccles as Tom Shead
 Graham Cheedle as Frank Collingwood
 Alexander Wolfe as Tobias
 Dani Harrison as Page Healy 
 Carolina Vella as Carie Winthrop-Pennyworth
 Lucas Smith as Henry Whistler
 Carole Bardsley as Tom`s mother
 Philip Svejnoha as August`s solicitor
 Sohe MacWhannel as Marion Pennyworth
 Brenda Catherall as Reverend
 Laura Marie Ring as Avril
 Sarah Burill as Verity
 Jason Redshaw as Burglar
 Pamela Taylor as Jude
 Dave Wake as Jason

Filming locations
Filming took place in Manchester, Lancashire, Cheshire and  Cumbria, England.

Release 
The film premiered on 26 April 2014 in England.

As of March 2021, it is available to stream on Amazon Prime Video in the USA, Canada and UK.

References

External links 
 

2014 films
Films shot in Greater Manchester
2010s English-language films